Courtney Cox may refer to:

 Courteney Cox (formerly Courteney Cox Arquette, born 1964), American actress and producer
 Courtney Cox (musician), American guitarist
 Courtney Cox Cole (née Cox), American athlete